Matías Ruiz may refer to:
Matías Ruiz (composer) (fl. 1665-1702), Spanish baroque composer
Matías Ruiz Sosa (born 1992), Argentine football midfielder
Matías Ruíz Díaz (born 1996), Argentine football rightback